Henry of Bar (c. 1362 – October 1397, in Treviso, Italy) was lord of Marle and the Marquis de Pont-à-Mousson. He was the eldest son of Robert I of Bar and Marie of Valois.

Early in his life, he was betrothed to the daughter of John I, Duke of Lorraine, Isabelle. However, the betrothal was broken and she would instead marry Enguerrand VII, Lord of Coucy.

In 1374, Henry went to the court of his uncle, King Charles V of France. In 1980, Henry was knighted at the coronation of his cousin, Charles VI. He would fight in the 1383 Flanders campaign and in the 1388 Guelders campaign. He then returned to Bar and governed it on behalf of his father, who was often immobilised by attacks of gout.

In November 1384, Henry himself married Marie de Coucy, Countess of Soissons (1366–1405), daughter of Enguerrand VII Count of Soissons & Sire de Coucy, by his first wife Princess Isabella of England, eldest daughter of King Edward III. Marie became Dame de Coucy et de Oisy following her father's death in 1397. Henry had two children by Marie: 
 Enguerrand (died ca. 1400),
 Robert of Bar, who became count of Marle and of Soissons.

In 1396, Henry negotiated the neutrality of Gian Galeazzo Visconti, Duke of Milan, in dealings with the French protectorate in the republic of Gênes. He then fought on the side of the Duke of Nevers in the crusade against the Ottoman Empire, being captured at the end of the Battle of Nicopolis on 25 September 1396. He was taken prisoner and later ransomed, but died at the crusader's camp in Treviso after contracting the plague in Venice on his return trip.

References

Sources

1362 births
1397 deaths
14th-century deaths from plague (disease)
Counts
Christians of the Battle of Nicopolis